Carlos David Morel (born 2 February 1987) is an Argentine professional footballer who plays as a goalkeeper for Deportivo Laferrere.

Career
Morel joined Boca Juniors' youth set-up from Resistencia Central in 2001. In July 2008, Morel completed a move to Chacarita Juniors of Primera B Nacional. He remained for one season as they won promotion, though didn't feature before leaving in 2009 to Sportivo Belgrano. 2010 saw Morel join Patronato. He played once in Torneo Argentino A. Morel resigned with Chacarita Juniors for 2010–11, appearing against San Martín, prior to rejoining Patronato. He made three appearances across three seasons, featuring against Independiente Rivadavia, Defensa y Justicia and Villa San Carlos having been benched sixty-four times.

On 28 July 2014, Morel was loaned to Primera B Metropolitana's Almagro. Two appearances followed, as they finished bottom of Zone 2 in 2014. Morel spent the 2015 campaign in the third tier with Deportivo Morón. He notably scored his first senior goal with the club, converting a penalty in a 1–0 win over Defensores de Belgrano on 15 August. After twenty-eight matches with the Buenos Aires outfit, Morel departed on 8 January 2016 to Deportivo Riestra. His first appearance came in March against Deportivo Armenio, which preceded a further twenty-nine in two seasons as they won promotion to tier two in 2016–17.

Morel spent the 2019–20 campaign with Gimnasia y Esgrima. Morel then returned to Deportivo Riestra, where he played for one and a half years, before joining Deportivo Laferrere ahead of the 2022 season.

Career statistics
.

Honours
Patronato
Torneo Argentino A: 2009–10

References

External links

1987 births
Living people
Sportspeople from Chaco Province
Argentine footballers
Association football goalkeepers
Torneo Argentino A players
Primera Nacional players
Primera B Metropolitana players
Chacarita Juniors footballers
Sportivo Belgrano footballers
Club Atlético Patronato footballers
Club Almagro players
Deportivo Morón footballers
Deportivo Riestra players
Gimnasia y Esgrima de Jujuy footballers
Deportivo Laferrere footballers